Robert Charles Dunlop Elliott,  (28 October 1884 – 6 March 1950) was an Australian politician. Born in Kyneton, Victoria, he was educated at state schools before becoming a businessman, owning country newspapers and radio stations. He was a company director, land owner and philanthropist. In 1928, he was elected to the Australian Senate as a Country Party Senator for Victoria, taking his seat in 1929. He was defeated for preselection in 1934 by former member of the House of Representatives William Gibson, and contested the Senate as an independent, winning 17.4% of the vote but failing to be elected. He was later Chairman of the Commonwealth Advisory Panel on Munitions Contracts from 1939 to 1940, and was personal assistant to the British Minister for Aircraft Production, Lord Beaverbrook, in 1940. Elliott died in 1950.

References

National Party of Australia members of the Parliament of Australia
Members of the Australian Senate for Victoria
Members of the Australian Senate
1880s births
1950 deaths
Independent members of the Parliament of Australia
20th-century Australian politicians
People from Kyneton
Australian Companions of the Order of St Michael and St George